Lanark Highlands is a township in eastern Ontario, Canada in Lanark County.  The township administrative offices are located in the village of Lanark.

History
The current township was incorporated on July 1, 1997 by amalgamating the former townships of Darling, Lanark, and the previously combined township Lavant, Dalhousie and North Sherbrooke with the village of Lanark.

Communities
The township comprises the communities of Arklan, Boyds, Brightside, Bullock, California, Cedardale, Clyde Forks, Clydesville, Dalhousie Lake, Elphin, Flower Station, Folger, French Line, Halls Mills, Halpenny, Hood, Hopetown, Joes Lake, Lammermoor, Lanark, Lavant, Lavant Station, Lloyd, Marble Bluff, McDonalds Corners, Middleville, Pine Grove, Poland, Quinn Settlement, Rosetta, Tatlock, Watsons Corners, and White, as well as the ghost town of Herrons Mills.

Demographics 

Notable people 

 Earl Manson, professional ice hockey player with the Seattle Metropolitans
 David Francey, songwriter, carpenter.

See also
List of townships in Ontario

References

External links

Township municipalities in Ontario
Lower-tier municipalities in Ontario
Municipalities in Lanark County